Amsterdam is an unincorporated community in Brazoria County, Texas, United States.

History
A post office operated there from 1897 until 1905, when mail was routed through Liverpool. The town shipped cotton to Galveston from area plantations and depended on water traffic in the 1890s. At its height around 1900, Amsterdam had a hotel and school. However, the Galveston hurricane of 1900 did considerable damage, and afterward the town failed to grow. State highway maps of 1936 showed only scattered dwellings at the townsite. By the 1970s construction of a nearby chemical plant had increased the number of local residences, and 1988 state highway maps showed several buildings. There was a fire station located in the town, but was closed down in the mid 1990s due to funding and lack of volunteers. In 2000 the population was 193.

Economy
There have been several business come and go in the small area throughout the years. One of these business was the Old Amsterdam Restaurant. It was owned by Edith and Marvin Zajicek. The business was closed in the early 1990s due to Marvin Zajicek receiving a cancer diagnosis. There have also been many bars that have come and go throughout the years. Currently there are two businesses that are still operational today. Lute's Marina right on the bayou. They are a small convenient store, bait shop, boat storage, and they also lower boats into the bayou. Horseshoe bend is the other business that is still operational, by day it is a quiet family restaurant on the bayou, where the public can also lower boats into the water and at night it is the local bar.

Education 
Amsterdam is within the Alvin Independent School District.

References 
County of Brazoria

External links 

Unincorporated communities in Brazoria County, Texas
Greater Houston
Unincorporated communities in Texas